Phuphania globosa is a species of air-breathing land snail, a terrestrial pulmonate gastropod mollusk in the family Dyakiidae.

This snail lives in the Phu Phan Mountains in northeastern Thailand.

The generic name Phuphania derives from the Phu Phan Mountains, where the snails comes from. The specific name globosa is a Latin word which means "spherical" or "globose".

Shell description 
The shell is dextral, and it has 5¾ whorls. The height of the shell is 34.08 mm. The width of the shell is 28.70 mm.

References

Dyakiidae
Gastropods described in 2007